Marvin Stein (1924-2015) was a mathematician and computer scientist, and the "father of computer science" at the University of Minnesota.

Early life
Marvin Stein was born in Cleveland, Ohio in 1924 to Russian-Jewish immigrants. The family later moved to Los Angeles, California to treat Stein's mother's tuberculosis. He graduated from Theodore Roosevelt High School in 1941, and immediately entered University of California, Los Angeles. His studies were interrupted and in 1942 he served in the US Army Signal Corps as a tabulating machine operator, and had a short stint working at IBM. He returned to school after the war and graduated from UCLA in 1947.

Stein did his Ph.D. at the Institute for Numerical Analysis at UCLA (or INA, an ancestor of UCLA's computer science department), where in the summer of 1949 he participated in a seminar on solving linear equations and finding eigenvalues and eigenvectors of matrices with several other future luminaries of the domain, including Magnus Hestenes, J. Barkley Rosser, George Forsythe, Cornelius Lanczos, Gertrude Blanch, and William Karush. Magnus Hestenes's work on the conjugate gradient method was a direct outgrowth of this group's work together over the summer. High speed computers were not available yet, so numerical experiments to test theoretical results were performed by hand by Stein and other researchers. Stein in particular studied Rayleigh–Ritz methods of variational problems.

After earning his Ph.D. from the INA in January 1951, Stein was hired as a senior research engineer by aircraft manufacturer Convair in southern California. He primarily worked on missile simulations for the SM-65 Atlas, on which he worked with a UNIVAC 1103. Though the 1103 had been made for and used by the Armed Forces Security Agency under the name "Atlas 2", this was the first commercially sold 1103. Stein's work installing the UNIVAC 1103 with Minnesotan and University of Minnesota alumnus Erwin Tomash introduced him to the emerging computer-science scene in Minnesota in the 1950s.

Stein lost his job with Convair when his security clearance was revoked by the House Un-American Activities Committee on account of Stein's Jewish heritage. It was later re-instated, but Stein had already decided to move on.

University of Minnesota
In 1955, Remington Rand, manufacturer of the UNIVAC computers, heard that the University of Minnesota was considering purchasing a machine from one of Rand's rivals: an IBM 650. Rand offered to simply give the university 400 free hours on a UNIVAC 1103 on the condition that they hire a dedicated faculty member to oversee its operations. Stein was hired in the IT Mathematics department in the University of Minnesota to fulfill this condition, and he assumed stewardship of the UNIVAC. The UNIVAC 1103 was around 60 feet long, 30 feet wide, and weighed over 17 tons.

Stein taught the first University of Minnesota courses on high-speed computation and played a singular role in developing the university's path to computer science education. In 1958, Stein was made the head of the university's Numerical Analysis Center at the Institute of Technology (later the University Computer Center), for which the university purchased its own 1103 at a discounted price of $250,000. The center was also home to a REAC 100. Stein maintained a computer archives system for decades, over three significantly different generations of machine.

In 1967, Stein created - with William Munro, Neal Amundson, and Hans Weinberger - the university's graduate program in Computer and Information Sciences. Three years later, in 1970, the university established a formal Computer Science department. Stein resigned as head of the Computer Center and became the first head of this new Computer Science department. He stepped down the following year, and served as a professor in the department until his retirement in 1997.

Stein received a Guggenheim fellowship in 1963-1964 for his work with Magnus Hestenes on the conjugate gradient method and for being the principal inventor of the Pope-Stein division algorithm and the Stein-Rose sorting algorithm. He served as a visiting professor of computer science at Weizmann Institute of Science in Rehovot, Israel from 1963 to 1964 and at Tel Aviv University and Hebrew University of Jerusalem from 1971 to 1972.

Death
Stein died in 2015. His papers are held in the University of Minnesota Archives.

Publications
In 1964, Stein wrote Computer Programming: A Mixed Language Approach with contributor William Munro for Academic Press. It was well reviewed in its time, and in 2017, more than five decades after its publication, it was still in print in its third edition. It was written with the intention to provide instruction in assembly language programming to both professional programmers and highly technical laypersons. Much of the book was originally designed around the CDC 1604 and the Fortran language.

Bibliography

Books
 Stein, Marvin; Munro, William. Computer Programming: A Mixed Language Approach. (1964) Academic Press.
 Stein, Marvin; Munro, William. A Fortran introduction to programming and computers: including Fortran IV. (1966) Academic Press.

Papers

Notes

University of Minnesota faculty
Academic staff of Weizmann Institute of Science
Tel Aviv University people
Academic staff of the Hebrew University of Jerusalem
University of California, Los Angeles alumni
American computer scientists
20th-century American mathematicians
Jewish American scientists
1924 births
2015 deaths
United States Army personnel of World War II
21st-century American Jews